The eighth competition weekend of the 2012–13 ISU Speed Skating World Cup was held in the Gunda Niemann-Stirnemann Halle in Erfurt, Germany, from Friday, 1 March, until Sunday, 3 March 2013.

Schedule of events
Schedule of the event:

Medal summary

Men's events

Women's events

References

8
Isu World Cup, 2012-13, 8
Sport in Erfurt
2010s in Thuringia